Cristian Portugués Manzanera (born 21 May 1992), commonly known as Portu, is a Spanish professional footballer who plays as an attacking midfielder for Getafe on loan from Real Sociedad.

Club career

Valencia
Born in Murcia, Portu was a product of Valencia CF's youth system. He made his senior debut with the reserves at only 17, going on to spend several seasons with the side in Segunda División B as well as one in Tercera División; in January 2012, he was called up by first-team manager Unai Emery due to a string of injuries.

Portu played his first official game with the Ches main squad on 27 February 2014, coming on as a late substitute for fellow youth graduate Federico Cartabia in a 0–0 home draw against FC Dynamo Kyiv in the round of 32 of the UEFA Europa League. His maiden appearance in La Liga came three days later, as he started and was booked in a 1–0 away loss to Rayo Vallecano.

Albacete
On 11 July 2014, it was announced that Valencia had sold Portu to Segunda División club Albacete Balompié with a buy-back option. He scored his first professional goals on 18 October, netting a brace but in a 3–2 defeat at CD Mirandés.

Girona
On 21 June 2016, after Alba's relegation, Portu signed a three-year deal with Girona FC also in the second tier. He scored eight goals (also providing eight assists) in his first season, helping the Catalans to a first-ever top flight promotion.

Portu bettered that total to 11 the following campaign, as Girona easily retained their league status.

Real Sociedad
On 18 June 2019, Real Sociedad announced via their Twitter account that they had reached a preliminary agreement for the transfer of Portu for a fee of €10 million; the five-year contract was confirmed the same day. He scored his first goal for his new team on 29 September, in a 3–2 away loss against Sevilla FC.

On 21 June 2022, Portu joined Getafe CF on loan with an option to buy.

Career statistics

Notes

HonoursReal Sociedad'
Copa del Rey: 2019–20

References

External links

Stats and bio at CiberChe 

1992 births
Living people
Spanish footballers
Footballers from Murcia
Association football midfielders
La Liga players
Segunda División players
Segunda División B players
Tercera División players
Valencia CF Mestalla footballers
Valencia CF players
Albacete Balompié players
Girona FC players
Real Sociedad footballers
Getafe CF footballers
Spain youth international footballers